The Copa Libertadores 1989 was the 30th edition in the tournament history. 21 teams participated in the competition, divided by groups of four (two per country). The first three teams qualify for the next round. Nacional of Montevideo entered directly into the second round as the champions of Copa Libertadores 1988. The tournament started with the first game on February 12, 1989, and ending on May 31, 1989.

Group stage

Twenty teams were divided into five groups of four teams each for the Group Stage. The top three teams of each group, as well as Nacional of Uruguay (who received a bye as winners of the Copa Libertadores 1988 of the tournament) qualified to the Round of 16.

Group 1

Group 2

Group 3

Group 4

Group 5

Bracket

Round of 16

First leg matches were played between April 5 and April 6. Second leg matches were played on April 12 and April 13.

|}

Quarter-finals

First leg matches were played on April 19. Second leg matches were played on April 26.

|}

Semi-finals

First leg marches were played on May 10. Second leg matches were played on May 17

|}

Finals

|}

Champion

References
 Copa Libertadores 1989 at RSSSF
 Copa Libertadores Tournament

External links

1
Copa Libertadores seasons